Antonia D. Reed (born April 22, 1966), known professionally as Bahamadia, is an American hip-hop artist and singer. Bahamadia released her debut album, Kollage, in 1996, followed by the independently released EP BB Queen in 2000. She then released a full-length album, Good Rap Music, in 2005. Bahamadia has also released the singles “Dialed Up Vol. 1” (in 2013), “Here” (in 2015), and “Dialed Up Vol. 2” (in 2018.)

Bahamadia has been a featured artist on tracks by musicians including The Roots, Jedi Mind Tricks, Erykah Badu, Morcheeba, Guru, and Towa Tei, among others.

In November 2016, Bahamadia appeared as a guest client on season 15 of Project Runway, in which her son, Mah-Jing Wong, was a contestant.

Career
She was a music DJ in house parties around Philadelphia. She gained attention from Guru of Gang Starr in 1993 for her song on the EP Funk Vibes.

Discography

Studio albums

Singles

Guest appearances

References

External links
 
 Bahamadia Official MySpace Page

American women rappers
African-American women rappers
Chrysalis Records artists
East Coast hip hop musicians
Good Vibe Recordings artists
Living people
Rappers from Philadelphia
Underground rappers
American hip hop DJs
Army of the Pharaohs members
1966 births
21st-century American rappers
21st-century American women musicians
20th-century African-American women
20th-century African-American people
20th-century African-American musicians
20th-century American rappers
20th-century American women musicians
20th-century American musicians
21st-century African-American women
21st-century African-American musicians
Gang Starr Foundation members
20th-century women rappers
21st-century women rappers